D56 motorway, formerly Expressway R56 is a highway in eastern Czech Republic. Although its current length is 33 km, only 12 km between Ostrava and Frýdek-Místek are signed as a motorway.

External links 
Info on ceskedalnice.cz 
Info on dalnice-silnice.cz 

R56